Frank Fraser may refer to:

 Frank Clarke Fraser (1920–2014), Canadian medical geneticist
 Frank L. Fraser (died 1935), American lawyer and politician

See also
 Frank Frazier (1960–2000), American football guard